The Cavill family of Australia is known for its significant contributions to the development of the sport of swimming.

Prominent family members in the sport include Frederick Cavill (1839-1927), sons Ernest Cavill (1868-1935), Charles Claude Cavill (1870 - 1897), Percy Frederick Cavill (1875-1940), Arthur Rowland Channel (Tums) Cavill (1877 - 1914), who is credited by sports journalist W.F. Corbett with originating the Australian crawl stroke, which now predominates in "freestyle" swimming races; and Sydney St. Leonards Cavill ("Sid") (1881 - 1945), was the originator of the butterfly stroke.  Youngest son Richmond (Dick) Theophilus Cavill (1884-1938) was the first to use the crawl in a competition, winning 100 yards State championship in 1899; and in England, in 1902, he was the first to swim 100 yards in under a minute.

Six members of the family were jointly inducted into the International Swimming Hall of Fame in 1970.

The three daughters, Madeline Cavill, Fredda Cavill and Alice Cavill  were all accomplished swimmers and swimming instructors.

His great-nephews Malcolm Cavill, Alistair Cavill and Stuart Cavill are significant in the city of Adelaide.

See also
 List of members of the International Swimming Hall of Fame

References

Swimming in Australia
Sports families of Australia